Ben Adams is an American politician serving as a member of the Idaho House of Representatives from the 13B district. Elected in November 2020, he assumed office on December 1, 2020.

Early life and education 
Adams was born in Jupiter, Florida. The son of a pastor, Adams lived in Kyiv with his family before relocating to Emmett, Idaho. He earned a Bachelor of Science degree in political science and government from Boise State University.

Career 
Adams served in the United States Marine Corps, reaching the rank of sergeant. During his career, Adams was twice deployed to Afghanistan. Since retiring from the military, Adams has worked as a football coach at Nampa High School and project manager for a water damage restoration company. He was elected to the Idaho House of Representatives in November 2020 and assumed office on December 1, 2020.

References 

5. https://www.idahostatesman.com/news/local/article250496294.html

Living people
People from Jupiter, Florida
People from Emmett, Idaho
Boise State University alumni
Republican Party members of the Idaho House of Representatives
People from Nampa, Idaho
Year of birth missing (living people)
United States Marines